Pillar Point Military Reservation, later Pillar Point Air Force Station is a United States Armed Forces facility on 48 acres founded on October 10, 1940, overlooking Pillar Point Harbor, California. Pillar Point is 15 miles south of the City of San Francisco in San Mateo County. The facility was built as part of the World War II  harbor defenses of San Francisco, as there was concern that the Japanese may attack San Francisco. For the defense of San Francisco installed at the point was large artillery, .50-caliber machine guns for anti-aircraft defense, searchlights, barracks, concrete bunkers, cyclone fences, and an electric system. In June 1944, a short-range UHF Surface Craft Detection Radar System, model SCR-296, built by Western Electric Company was installed. The SCR-296 could detect and track seagoing surface craft.

After the war, on January 17, 1946, the radar system was removed. In 1949 the Military Reservation was closed. The US Navy opened the base on September 4, 1959, as a missile tracking station in support of Naval Air Station Point Mugu's Regulus missile program and later Minuteman missiles. In the 1960s the base was transferred to the US  Air Force, who took over the missile tracking station. From 1967 to 1972, the station tracked  Minuteman II missiles. In The current tracking units are AN/FPQ-6 and AN/MPS-36 radars systems, which are C-band radar from the Western Range (USSF) of Vandenberg Air Force Base. Pillar Point is presently used by the United States Space Force for tracking polar-orbiting space satellite and operational intercontinental ballistic missiles launched from Vandenberg, the United States Navy, and the United States Air Force Special Operations Command. For extra protection, a breakwater was installed in 1961 and a second breakwater installed in 1982.

The Point is 0.3 miles wide and 0.25 miles long, with an elevation from 80 to 180 feet. The point is connected to the coast by a narrow isthmus on the northeastern side. Pillar Point Air Force Station was part of Rancho Corral de Tierra. Just North of the base was Half Moon Bay Flight Strip an auxiliary airfield for Salinas Army Air Base training during World War II. The Half Moon Bay Flight Strip is now Eddie Andreini Sr. Airfield.
There is a prehistoric artifact site, CA-SMA-151, at the station, which is listed on the National Register of Historic Places.

See also

California during World War II
American Theater (1939–1945)
United States home front during World War II

References

California in World War II
Installations of the United States Air Force in California
1940 establishments in California